Chicago Concert is a live album by saxophonists James Moody and Gene Ammons recorded in Chicago in 1971 and released on the Prestige label.

Reception

The Allmusic review by Scott Yanow stated "This meeting between Gene Ammons and James Moody is not as memorable as one might hope... although there are a few sparks, they do not blend together that well and the results are surprisingly workmanlike".

Track listing 
 "Just in Time" (Betty Comden, Adolph Greenl, Jule Styne) - 6:49     
 "Work Song" (Nat Adderley) - 8:11     
 "Have You Met Miss Jones?" (Lorenz Hart, Richard Rodgers) - 6:32     
 "Jim-Jam-Jug" (Gene Ammons) - 8:17     
 "I'll Close My Eyes" (Buddy Kaye, Billy Reid) - 4:56     
 "C Jam Blues" (Barney Bigard, Duke Ellington) - 5:04     
 "Yardbird Suite" (Charlie Parker) - 14:06 Bonus track on CD reissue

Personnel 
Gene Ammons, James Moody - tenor saxophone
Jodie Christian - piano
Cleveland Eaton - bass
Marshall Thompson - drums

References 

1973 live albums
Prestige Records live albums
Gene Ammons live albums
James Moody (saxophonist) live albums
Albums produced by Ozzie Cadena